Dolichoderus intermedius is an extinct species of Miocene ant in the genus Dolichoderus. Described by Mackay in 1993, a fossilised worker was found in the Dominican amber, although the specific locality has not been given.

References

†
Fossil taxa described in 1993
Miocene insects
†
Fossil ant taxa